The Puerto Rico International is an open badminton tournament held in Puerto Rico, organized by the Badminton Pan Am and Puerto Rico Badminton Federation (Fepurba). The tournament has been an International Series level since 1995, then in 2009–2013 categorized as International Challenge, and in 2014 back to International Series level from Badminton World Federation.

Previous Winners

References 

Badminton tournaments
Sports competitions in Puerto Rico